The Golden Rose Bulgarian Feature Film Festival is held  in Varna in September or October. Also known as Golden Rose National Film Festival or simply Golden Rose Film Festival, the event was first held in August 1961 under the name "Bulgarian Film Festival"; it ran annually until 1974 (other than 1965) and after that it was usually held every two years. The 34th Golden Rose Film Festival was held September 19 to 25, 2016.

Awards
The first time the festival was held, in 1961, the prize-winning film was We Were Young. The top award was originally called the Special Award of the Festival, but in 1963 the name was changed to "Golden Rose". It is also referred to as the Grand Prix. A statuette for the Golden Rose was designed by sculptor Vezhdi Rashidov.

As of 2016, the festival has ten awards determined by its jury, and five other awards:

 Golden Rose Award for Best Feature Film
 Golden Rose Award for Best Short Film
 Special Award of the City of Varna
 Best Director Award
 Best Screenwriter Award
 Best Cinematographer Award
 Best Actress Award
 Best Actor Award
 Best Feature Film Debut
 Honourable Special Prize
 The Union of Bulgarian Filmmakers Award
 The Critics Guild Award (UBF)
 Special Mention for Short Film
 People's Choice Award
 Accredited Journalists' Award

References

External links
 
 
 
 Bulgarian National Film Center

Film festivals in Bulgaria
Culture in Varna, Bulgaria